Piemontesi is an Italian surname. Notable people with the surname include:

Domenico Piemontesi (1903–1987), Italian cyclist
Fabrice Piemontesi (born 1983), Italian cyclist
Francesco Piemontesi (born 1983), Swiss pianist

Italian-language surnames
Italian toponymic surnames
Ethnonymic surnames